Zolotytsia is an extinct genus of fossil animals from the late Ediacaran period (Vendian) which contains only one known species, Z. biserialis. Specimens of this species have been found in Russia, Ukraine and India.

Description

Specimens exhibit two distinctive rows of oval-shaped structures, positioned either side of a mid-line groove, each row being divided by a deep, but narrow groove. The lack of symmetry in the oval bodies has been attributed to possible deformation after death.

Occurrence
Fossils have been found in the Ust' Pinega Formation, located in Northern Russia; the Valdai Group, located in Russia; the Bernashevka Beds; the Mogilev Formation, located in Ukraine and in the Krol Formation, located in India.

See also

 List of Ediacaran genera

References

Ediacaran
Aquatic animals
Ediacaran life
Enigmatic prehistoric animal genera
White Sea fossils
Fossil taxa described in 1981